Hiromori Kawashima (February 2, 1922 – December 9, 2012) was a Japanese executive. He served as the Commissioner of Baseball in Nippon Professional Baseball from 1998 to 2004. He is a member of the Japanese Baseball Hall of Fame.

Kawashima was an alumnus of Chuo University.

In the 1970s Kawashima was director of the Japan Railway Construction Public Corporation (JRCC). He was one of six JRCC executives forced to step down in September 1979 when it was revealed that the corporation had used money intended for overtime and other expenses for personal vacations.

In December 1998 Kawashima and Major League Baseball commissioner Bud Selig and signed the revised United States – Japanese Player Contract Agreement, which initiated the "posting system."  It required MLB teams to place "bids" for NPB players, which became the basis of transfer fees that are paid as compensation to NPB teams whose star players sign with MLB.

References

External links
Japanese Baseball Hall of Fame
Hiromori Kawashima's obituary 

1922 births
2012 deaths
Nippon Professional Baseball commissioners
Chuo University alumni